1,4-Benzodioxine, in chemistry, especially organic chemistry, is an aromatic ring.

See also 
 Benzodioxan
 1,3-Benzodioxole
 Ethylenedioxy

References 

Simple aromatic rings
Benzodioxins